Litz Glacier is a glacier flowing northeast from the vicinity of Smith Peak and Litz Bluff in north-central Thurston Island, Antarctica. The glacier enters the west part of Peale Inlet north of the Guy Peaks. It was named by the Advisory Committee on Antarctic Names after A.K. Litz, Chief Photographer's Mate in the Eastern Group of Operation Highjump, which obtained aerial photographs of this glacier and adjacent coastal areas, 1946–47.

See also
 List of glaciers in the Antarctic
 Glaciology

Maps
 Thurston Island – Jones Mountains. 1:500000 Antarctica Sketch Map. US Geological Survey, 1967.
 Antarctic Digital Database (ADD). Scale 1:250000 topographic map of Antarctica. Scientific Committee on Antarctic Research (SCAR). Since 1993, regularly upgraded and updated.

References

 

Glaciers of Thurston Island